(IMEC), translated as The Institute for Contemporary Publishing Archives,  is a French institution created in 1988 at the initiative of researchers and professionals in French publishing  to gather archives and studies related to the main French publishing houses. It also collects material concerning French magazines and various other players in French literary life. It is a not for profit organisation. Since 2004 it has been based at the Ardenne Abbey near Caen, Normandy, where it has a library of 80,000 books, and more than 15 km of shelving.
The reading room is open to researchers.

External links 
Official website (English)

Archives in France
Publishing
Organizations established in 1988